Rachel Tassa (born 1952) is a former Israeli wheelchair fencer and wheelchair basketball player. She won 11 Paralympic medals: two individual medals in wheelchair fencing, two medals in swimming and seven medals as a member of Israel's women's team in wheelchair basketball and wheelchair fencing.

Tassa contracted polio when she was 18 months old. At the age of 11, in 1964 she began her practice at the Israel Sports Center for the Disabled.

At the 1972 Summer Paralympics, she won four medals: a gold medal in Women's Novices Foil and a bronze medal as a member of the women's wheelchair basketball team, an individual bronze medal in women's foil and a second bronze medal for swimming, reaching third place at the 100m freestyle tournament. Tassa competed in other fencing and swimming events, setting high scores but failing to achieve further medals.

At the 1976 Summer Paralympics, she won a gold medal as a member of the women's wheelchair basketball team  and two individual medals: a silver medal in women's foil and a bronze medal competing at the women's 50m butterfly swimming event

At the 1980 Summer Paralympics, she won two silver medals as a member of the women's foil team in wheelchair fencing and the women's wheelchair basketball team.

At the 1984 Summer Paralympics, she won a silver medal as a member of Israel's women's wheelchair basketball team.

At the 1988 Summer Paralympics, she won her final bronze medal with the women's wheelchair fencing foil team.

References

External links
 

1952 births
Living people
Paralympic athletes of Israel
Paralympic swimmers of Israel
Paralympic wheelchair basketball players of Israel
Paralympic wheelchair fencers of Israel
Athletes (track and field) at the 1972 Summer Paralympics
Swimmers at the 1972 Summer Paralympics
Swimmers at the 1976 Summer Paralympics
Wheelchair basketball players at the 1972 Summer Paralympics
Wheelchair basketball players at the 1976 Summer Paralympics
Wheelchair basketball players at the 1980 Summer Paralympics
Wheelchair basketball players at the 1984 Summer Paralympics
Wheelchair basketball players at the 1988 Summer Paralympics
Wheelchair fencers at the 1972 Summer Paralympics
Wheelchair fencers at the 1976 Summer Paralympics
Wheelchair fencers at the 1980 Summer Paralympics
Wheelchair fencers at the 1988 Summer Paralympics
Medalists at the 1972 Summer Paralympics
Medalists at the 1976 Summer Paralympics
Medalists at the 1980 Summer Paralympics
Medalists at the 1984 Summer Paralympics
Medalists at the 1988 Summer Paralympics
Paralympic gold medalists for Israel
Paralympic silver medalists for Israel
Paralympic bronze medalists for Israel